Pennsylvania State Senate District 23 includes all of Bradford County, Lycoming County, Sullivan County, Tioga County, and Union County. It is currently represented by Republican Gene Yaw.

Senators

References

Pennsylvania Senate districts
Government of Bradford County, Pennsylvania
Government of Lycoming County, Pennsylvania
Government of Sullivan County, Pennsylvania
Government of Susquehanna County, Pennsylvania
Government of Union County, Pennsylvania